Coombe Dean School Academy, opened in 1976, is a secondary school located on the outskirts of Plymouth, Devon, England. , it had 970 pupils. The school gained Specialist School status in September 2003. Ofsted awarded the school 'Outstanding' status in 2009 and 2012. However, in November 2018 the school received 'Requires Improvement'. As a high performing school, Coombe Dean was given the option to become an independent academy in 2010, which was actioned in September 2011.

In 2004, work started on building a larger hall, an all-weather AstroTurf pitch and an extended Mathematics facility with eight new classrooms. A new English block with geothermal heat pump was built in 2007 and renovations to the Technology block were completed in 2008. Also in July 2008, solar panels were integrated into the roof of the School Drama Hall. A new Post-16 block was  built as an extension to the Art block in 2012, and an overhaul to the PE block was completed in the summer of 2013. The Science (C) block was renovated to a modern specification in 2013, and the Library (D) block has been updated and extended to incorporate an extended Student Services / Inclusion department (L block.)

The school offers The Duke of Edinburgh's Award scheme and takes part in the annual Ten Tors event. Other applied learning events include; European exchange weeks, tall ships voyages and a sailing school.

During the Easters of 2011, 2013, 2015 and 2017, students from the school visited Everest Base Camp to donate computer equipment and clothing to a Nepalese school.

References

External links

Plymouth City Council Directory Listing

Educational institutions established in 1976
Academies in Plymouth, Devon
1976 establishments in England
Secondary schools in Plymouth, Devon